Labdia thalamaula is a moth in the family Cosmopterigidae. It is found in Australia, where it has been recorded from Queensland.

References

Natural History Museum Lepidoptera generic names catalog

Labdia
Moths of Queensland
Moths described in 1915